Jean-Baptiste Donnet (28 September 1923 in Pontgibaud (Puy-de-Dôme) – 30 November 2014 in Sentheim (Haut-Rhin)) was a French chemist who is noted as a pioneer in the surface chemistry of carbon black and as a founder of the Upper Alsace University.

He was the father of French journalist Pierre-Antoine Donnet.

Biography 
Jean-Baptiste Donnet, from a modest background, received his secondary education by correspondence, while an apprentice craftsman. After World War II, he earned his Bachelor of Science degree in chemical engineering.

His scientific career began in CNRS at Strasbourg, then Mulhouse from 1953. He is one of the founders in 1970 of the academic center of Mulhouse, which in 1975 became the University of Haute-Alsace.

Career 
 Professor (emeritus) of the Upper Alsace University
 former Research director at CNRS
 former President of the Société française de chimie
 former University president of the Upper Alsace University

Recognitions 
 Carl-Dietrich-Harries-Medal for commendable scientific achievements (1985) 
 Colwyn medal in 1988
 Honorary Doctorate from the université de Neuchâtel (1993)
 Honorary Doctorate from the Lodz University of Technology (1989)
 Honorary President of the Upper Alsace University
 Honorary President of the Société française de chimie
 Commander of the Legion of Honor (decreed 19 April 2000)
 Charles Goodyear Medal (1998)

References 

 http://www.memoiresdeguerre.com/article-donnet-jean-baptiste-116075295.html

Polymer scientists and engineers
1923 births
2014 deaths
Research directors of the French National Centre for Scientific Research